In digital signal processing,  a channelizer is a term used for algorithms which select a certain frequency band from an input signal. The input signal typically has a higher sample rate than the sample rate of the selected channel. It is also used for algorithms that can select multiple channels from an input signal in an efficient way.

One of the most common methods for selecting a channel from an input signal is to first shift the frequency by multiplying it with a complex sinusoid, then passing the signal through a low pass filter. Alternatively, a decimator (rate changer) can be used. One common type of channelizer is the polyphase channelizer.

Decimation is the process of reducing  sample rate. Decimation originally meant "take one sample in every 10", but later this term was generalized to simply mean any reduction in sample rate.
Digital signal processing